Li Zhe may refer to:

Emperor Zhongzong of Tang (656–710), named Li Zhe, Chinese emperor of the Tang Dynasty
Li Zhe (footballer) (born 1981), Chinese football player
Li Zhe (Go player) (born 1989), Chinese Go player
Li Zhe (tennis) (born 1989), Chinese tennis player